The Council of Ministers is a proposed body of Zimbabwean government ministers. It was conceptualized as a separate body from the Cabinet according to the agreement reached at the conclusion of negotiations between presidential rivals Morgan Tsvangirai and Robert Mugabe. It will be instituted by the next constitution of Zimbabwe.

While the Cabinet will be chaired by the president and will be a policy decision-making body, the Council of Ministers will be headed by the prime minister and will be a liaison office; in addition, the council will assist in the formulation of policies, the supervision of government ministries by the prime minister and the implementation of cabinet policies. While it is not currently known how the Council of Ministers will be composed, many reports indicate that the ministers in the Cabinet (composing 31 out of 43 members) will also be the members of the Council of Ministers.

Composition
The Council of Ministers, which will form a subset of the larger Cabinet, will be chaired by the prime minister; the 31 seats will be divided between the MDC, whose Tsvangirai and Mutambara branches will possess 13 and 3 ministers respectively, and the ZANU-PF, which will possess 15 members.

The deputy ministers of government will also be divided along proportional lines: Zanu 8, MDC-T 6 and MDC-M 1. The retaining of 15 deputy ministers instead of the previous 20 was also a provision of the negotiated deal.

Retained ministries under the Council of Ministers
The prime minister shall be the chair of the council of ministers and they shall meet weekly to check on the progress of the government

 Economic Planning and Development (restructured)
 Industry and Commerce, Regional Integration and International Trade (restructured; with deputy minister)
 Environment, Natural Resources and Tourism (restructured)
 Justice, Parliamentary and Constitutional Affairs (restructured)
 State Enterprises and Empowerment (restructured)
 Public Works and Rural Development (restructured; with deputy minister)
 Media, Information and Publicity (restructured)
 Youth, Arts, Sports and Culture (restructured)
 Prisons and Correctional Services (new ministry)
 Education (reduced portfolio; with deputy minister)
 Health (reduced portfolio; with deputy minister)
 Local Government (reduced portfolio; with deputy minister)
 Lands and Resettlement (reduced portfolio; with deputy minister)
 Agriculture (reduced portfolio; with deputy minister)
 Water Resources (reduced portfolio; with deputy minister)
 Public Service (reduced portfolio)
 National Housing (reduced portfolio)
 Transport (reduced portfolio; with deputy minister)
 Defence (with deputy minister)
 Home Affairs (with deputy minister)
 Foreign Affairs (with deputy minister)
 Finance (with deputy minister)
 Labour and Social Services (with deputy minister)
 Energy (with deputy minister)

Ministries to be placed under presidential oversight
 National Security

Government of Zimbabwe